Kōnan Station is the name of three train stations in Japan:

 Kōnan Station (Shiga) (甲南駅)
 Kōnan Station (Aichi) (江南駅)
 Kōnan Station (Shimane) (江南駅)